William Slater (1819 – 17 December 1872) was an English architect who was born in Northamptonshire and practised in London. He oversaw restoration of many churches, latterly in partnership with R. H. Carpenter.

Career 
He joined Richard Cromwell Carpenter as his first pupil. For some years lived with the Carpenter family, and he became Carpenter's assistant. Slater left to establish an independent practice with another of Carpenter's pupils, William Smith (later Bassett-Smith). Carpenter died in 1855 at the age of 42, and Slater was persuaded to take over his practice. In 1857 Carpenter's son Richard Herbert Carpenter joined him as a pupil, and became a partner in 1863.

Work
Slater and Smith designed a parsonage and restored three churches.

When R. C. Carpenter died he left uncompleted the rebuilding of the parish church of SS Simon and Jude, Earl Shilton, Leicestershire. Slater took over the work and completed it in 1856.

In 1863 Slater and an architect called Gillet directed the restoration of the parish church of SS Peter and Paul, Scaldwell, Northamptonshire.

Solo works

 Loughborough Town Hall, Leicestershire, 1855.
 Restoration of St Mary's Church, Higham Ferrers, Northamptonshire, about 1857.
 North aisle and northwest tower of St Mary's church, Stowting, Kent, 1857–68.
 Restoration of St Mary's church, Finedon, Northamptonshire, 1858.
 Chancel of St Faith's church, Newton-in-the-Willows, Northamptonshire, 1858.
 Restoration of St Michael's church, Haselbech, Northamptonshire, 1859–60.
 Addition of battlements and spire to the tower of All Saints' church, Naseby, Northamptonshire, 1859–60.
 Restoration of the parish church of SS Peter and Paul, Easton Maudit, Northamptonshire, 1859–61.
 New pulpit for St Dionysius' Church, Market Harborough, Leicestershire, carved by J Forsyth in 1860 but removed in 1975.
 Restoration of St Wilfrid's church, Kibworth Beauchamp, Leicestershire, 1860–64.
 Rebuilding of the chancel arch in All Saints' church, Thurlaston, Leicestershire, 1861.
 Restoration of St Mary's church, Stapleford, Wiltshire, 1861.
 Restoration of the Anglo-Saxon St Mary's Priory Church, Deerhurst, Gloucestershire, 1861–63.
 Restoration of St John the Baptist, Thorpe Achurch, Northamptonshire, 1861–63.
 Restoration of St John the Baptist, Kingsthorpe, Northamptonshire, 1863.
 East window of St Peter's church, Wymondham, Leicestershire, inserted in 1864.
 Restoration of St Mary's church, Burton Latimer, Northamptonshire, and rebuilding of tower, 1866.
 Window tracery for St Peter's church, Aldwinkle, Northamptonshire (date unknown).
 Restoration of St Michael's church, Great Oakley, Northamptonshire (date unknown).
 Restoration of SS Peter and Paul, Kettering, Northamptonshire (date unknown).
 Restoration of St Botolph's church, Stoke Albany, Northamptonshire (date unknown).
 Restoration of the nave of St Mary's church, Woodford, Northamptonshire (date unknown).

With R. H. Carpenter

 Restoration of the church of St Michael the Archangel, Sittingbourne, Kent, 1859–73. Slater designed the reredos, which was made in 1860.
 Rebuilding of the chancel of St Mary's church, Edith Weston, Rutland, and a south chapel and organ loft, 1865.
 Restoration of St Mary's church in Goudhurst, Kent, 1865 to 1870.
 Restoration of St Peter's church, Little Oakley, Northamptonshire, 1867.
 Restoration of All Saints' church, Pitsford, Leicestershire, 1867.
 Chapel of Cheam School in Surrey, built 1867–68. Now part of the Roman Catholic church of St Christopher.
 Restoration of Market Harborough Grammar School, Leicestershire, 1868.
 Main building of Denstone College, Staffordshire, 1868–73. $
 Restoration of St Nicholas' church, Bulwick, Northamptonshire, 1870.
 Tracery for the east window of St Andrew's church, Cransley, Northamptonshire, 1870.
 Rebuilding of St Luke's church, Thurnby, Leicestershire, 1870–73.
 Restoration of St Peter's church, Alvescot, Oxfordshire, 1870–72.
 Rebuilding of St Leonard's church, Tortworth, Gloucestershire, 1872.
 Holdenby House, Northamptonshire, 1873–75.

References

Bibliography

1819 births
1872 deaths
19th-century English architects
English ecclesiastical architects
Gothic Revival architects
Architects from Northamptonshire